The Westbank First Nation is a self-governing First Nations band in the Okanagan region of British Columbia, Canada, and is one of eight bands that comprise the Okanagan Nation Alliance. Westbank First Nation (WFN) is governed by one chief (Chief Robert Louie) and four councillors, elected every three years by WFN membership (the current term is 2023-2025). As of April 2019, WFN's membership totaled 914 members, and employs more than 200 people.

Government

Westbank reserves were once part of the Okanagan Indian Band until they separated and became an independent band in 1963. 27 years later, in 1990, a framework agreement was entered into which allowed community-based self-government to be negotiated. On May 6, 2004, the Westbank First Nation Self-Government Act (Bill C-11) received royal assent and became law. WFN self-government officially came into force April 1, 2005.

Following the enactment of self-government, WFN members developed the Westbank First Nation constitution, which sets out how the community is governed and how it exercises its jurisdiction. Some of the other areas the constitution provides for are democratic and legitimate elections and government; internal financial management; accountability to WFN members; conflict of interest rules; law enactment procedures; land rules and referendum procedures.

Advisory Council
In 2005, following the signing of self-government, the WFN Advisory Council was put in place. The Advisory Council is a five-member council, elected every three years by WFN residents, that meets regularly to review and make recommendations on issues that directly and significantly affect tax payers such as tax expenditures, proposed laws and proposed amendments to laws. Currently there are approximately 11,000 non-WFN member residents living on WFN lands.

Indian Reserves
Westbank First Nation's land base totals 5,340 acres, separated into five  land parcels. Westbank First Nation's two populated reserves border the westside of Okanagan Lake and are located adjacent to the City of West Kelowna, while the remaining three reserves are located on the east side of Okanagan Lake. 
Indian reserves under the jurisdiction of the Westbank First Nation are:
Tsinstikeptum Indian Reserve No. 9, 641.8 ha., 6 miles southwest of the City of Kelowna,
Tsinstikeptum Indian Reserve No. 10, 339 ha., immediately opposite the City of Kelowna,
Medicine Creek Indian Reserve No. 12, 662.50 ha., 10 km southeast of downtown Kelowna,
Medicine Hill Indian Reserve No. 11, 515.70 ha., 15 km southeast of downtown Kelowna, 
Mission Creek Indian Reserve No. 8, 2 ha., on left bank of Mission Creek 1 mile from Okanagan Lake, 2 miles south of downtown Kelowna

See also
Okanagan people
Robert Louie

References

External links 
Westbank First Nation 
ntityix Development Corporation 

Okanagan
Syilx governments